Sheldon Keefe (born September 17, 1980) is a Canadian professional ice hockey coach and former player. He is the head coach of the Toronto Maple Leafs of the National Hockey League. His younger brother Adam Keefe is the head coach of Elite Ice Hockey League champions, the Belfast Giants.

At age 42, he is the youngest head coach of the 32 teams in the NHL.

Playing career
As a youth, Keefe played in the 1994 Quebec International Pee-Wee Hockey Tournament with the Toronto Young Nationals minor ice hockey team.

In the 1998–99 season with the Toronto St. Michael's Majors and the Barrie Colts of the Ontario Hockey League, Keefe scored over 100 points, and was named the OHL Rookie of the Year, over Jason Spezza and Brad Boyes. Keefe was then selected 47th overall, in the 1999 NHL Entry Draft as the second choice of the Tampa Bay Lightning and subsequently signed a three-year contract with the team. In the 1999–2000 OHL season, Keefe led the OHL in scoring and set a Colts franchise record for most points in a season in the process, posting 121 points (48 goals, 73 assists) in 66 games. During that season's playoffs, Keefe led the Colts to a seven-game victory over the Plymouth Whalers to claim the only OHL championship in Colts history. Keefe and the Colts drew national attention for their on- and off-ice behaviour which called into question the character of the players. Upon winning the OHL championship, Keefe, as captain of the Colts, infamously refused to shake the hand of league commissioner David Branch, telling him, "this must burn your ass." At the Memorial Cup, the team walked out on a customary banquet, threatened members of the opposing Rimouski Oceanic, and refused to shake hands with Branch, also serving as Canadian Hockey League president, during pregame ceremonies. Their season ended with a 6–2 loss to the Oceanic in the Memorial Cup final.

Keefe made his NHL debut on October 18, 2000, in his first professional season in 2000–01. He was shortly demoted to their American Hockey League team but was suspended without pay for failing to show up. In the summer of 2004, Keefe was acquired by the Phoenix Coyotes. He did not play a game for the Coyotes, but in the 2004–05 season Keefe played 4 games for the Utah Grizzlies (1995-2005). In September 2005, Keefe was re-signed as a restricted free agent by the Phoenix Coyotes and reassigned to San Antonio (AHL).

After just five professional seasons, Keefe opted to end his professional career and continue his career in hockey with coaching.

Coaching career

Pembroke Lumber Kings (2006–2012)
Keefe purchased the Pembroke Lumber Kings, a struggling Junior A franchise in the Central Canada Hockey League, in July 2003. After a knee injury effectively ended his career in the 2004–05 AHL season, Keefe began to assist Lumber Kings head coach and general manager Kevin Abrams. The Lumber Kings went 50–7–1–1 in the 2005–06 season and were ranked first overall in Canada before being upset in the second round of the playoffs by the Nepean Raiders. During the 2005–06 season, Keefe's then agent, David Frost, caused a wave of concern throughout the CJHL when he was found in an off limits area of an Ottawa arena. He was also filmed by CBC's The Fifth Estate which then ran a documentary showing Frost attending several Lumber Kings games, thus putting the league in a bad light considering the ongoing criminal investigation of a sexual nature against Frost at the time.

Keefe was named as head coach and general manager of the Lumber Kings on June 6, 2006, after Abrams was promoted to league commissioner. In 2006–07, his first year, he led the Lumber Kings to a 41–10–2–2 record and guided the team to its first league championship in 18 years. The Lumber Kings then defeated the St-Jérôme Panthers at the Fred Page Cup to claim the Eastern Canadian championship. At the national championship-deciding Royal Bank Cup, the Lumber Kings lost to the Aurora Tigers in overtime of the semi-final to end their season.

Over the next three seasons, the Lumber Kings continued to develop under Keefe, and culminated in three more championships for the Pembroke club.

As the 2010–11 CCHL season began, the Lumber Kings were seeking a fifth straight league championship under Keefe's reign. The Lumber Kings went 51–9–2–2 and entered the postseason ranked 7th in Canada. After going undefeated through the first two rounds, they met the Cornwall Colts in the CCHL final. A hard-fought series saw the Lumber Kings prevail in six games to claim a fifth straight league championship, becoming the first team in league history to do so. The team proceeded to emerge victorious at the Fred Page Cup in a victory over the Longueuil Collège Français and advanced to the Royal Bank Cup to compete for the national championship. After eliminating the Camrose Kodiaks in the semi-final, they met the Vernon Vipers to decide the Royal Bank Cup. The Vipers were seeking a third straight national title, and the Lumber Kings were looking for their first in the treasured history of the club. Keefe's squad battled to a 2–0 victory to become the 2011 Royal Bank Cup Champions.

Midway through the 2012–13 CCHL season, Keefe announced that he was leaving the Lumber Kings to become the head coach of the Ontario Hockey League's Sault Ste. Marie Greyhounds. He finished his CCHL coaching career with a record of 285–95–12, establishing team records for most career wins and highest career win percentage. Keefe announced over Twitter on May 29, 2013, that he had sold the Pembroke Lumber Kings to former Calgary Flames player, and Eganville native Dale McTavish. On October 4, 2013, Keefe returned to Pembroke as he was honoured with a banner raised to the rafters of the Pembroke Memorial Centre in recognition of his era with the team.

Sault Ste. Marie Greyhounds (2012–2015)
On December 3, 2012, Keefe was named the head coach of the Ontario Hockey League's Sault Ste. Marie Greyhounds. Keefe quickly turned around a faltering Greyhounds team and transformed them into a powerhouse. In 2013–2014, his first full season as head coach, the Greyhounds were 44–17–7 and finished atop the West Division. They were swept in the second round of the playoffs at the hands of future NHL 1st overall draft pick Connor McDavid and the Erie Otters.

In 2014–2015, the Greyhounds' revitalization was complete, and the team posted their greatest season in franchise history, topping the OHL with a 54–12–2 record thanks to a league-leading 342 goals scored. Keefe was awarded the Matt Leyden Trophy as the OHL's top coach and was named the CHL Coach of the Year. Keefe's Greyhounds showed their strength in the playoffs, sweeping both the first and second round to enter the Western Conference final undefeated. However, it was McDavid and the Otters once again ending the Greyhounds' run, as the Otters topped the Greyhounds in six games.

Toronto Marlies (2015–2019)

After three successful seasons with the Greyhounds, on June 8, 2015, Keefe was named the head coach of the Toronto Marlies of the American Hockey League, the top affiliate of the Toronto Maple Leafs. Keefe coached the Marlies to the franchise's first Calder Cup in 2018 and won a total of 199 games as an American Hockey League head coach. The next year, he signed a two-year extension with the Marlies.

Toronto Maple Leafs (2019–present)
On November 20, 2019, Keefe was announced as Mike Babcock's successor after Babcock was relieved of his duties by Maple Leafs' president Brendan Shanahan. The following day, Keefe signed a three-year deal with the Maple Leafs. In Keefe's first 20 games as head coach of the Maple Leafs, the team posted a 15–4–1 record, the best start of any head coach in Toronto's 102-year history. The team's play cooled off somewhat afterwards, and his first season ended in a defeat to the Columbus Blue Jackets in the qualifying round of the expanded 2020 playoffs, the fourth straight season the team failed to advance past the first round of the postseason.

As Keefe prepared for his first full season as head coach, Keefe's team of assistants was overhauled, as assistant coaches Paul McFarland and Andrew Brewer both left the organization. Manny Malhotra and Paul MacLean were brought in as their replacements.

Career statistics

Playing record

Coaching record
 – replaced midseason
 – midseason replacement

NHL

* Season shortened due to the COVID-19 pandemic during the 2019–20 season. Playoffs were played in August 2020 with a different format.
⌑ Season shortened due to the COVID-19 pandemic during the 2020–21 season.

AHL

OHL

CCHL

Awards
OHL All-Rookie Team (1999)
OHL Rookie of the Year (1999)
OHL Second All-Star Team (2000)
OHL Top Scorer (2000)
Canadian Major Junior First All-Star Team (2000)
Memorial Cup Tournament All-Star Team (2000)

References

External links
 

1980 births
Barrie Colts players
Detroit Vipers players
Canadian ice hockey right wingers
Canadian ice hockey coaches
Hershey Bears players
Ice hockey people from Ontario
Living people
Sportspeople from Brampton
Springfield Falcons players
Tampa Bay Lightning draft picks
Tampa Bay Lightning players
Toronto St. Michael's Majors players
Toronto Maple Leafs coaches
Toronto Marlies coaches
Utah Grizzlies (AHL) players